Vitamins is the third studio album by Irish anti-folk band Music for Dead Birds.

Background and release

The album was recorded in one weekend at Data Studios, County Kerry, with recording engineer Tadgh Healy. The album was released on 17 April 2014 as both a Pay what you want digital download and a limited edition CD run of 100 copies. Lead track The Farmer's Corn was broadcast by 2fm in Ireland and 2SER in Australia. A music video was produced for the track Magic Witch which received national media attention for its dark content.

Track listing

All songs written by Jimmy Monaghan.

 "Forever Wasted" – 2:24
 "It's Fine" – 3:06
 "Magic Witch" – 2:48
 "The Farmer's Corn" – 5:30
 "Dead Pets" – 3:52
 "Churchbells" – 2:18
 "I Could See It" – 1:43
 "Right Eye Open"  – 3:20
 "Penitentiary" – 2:51
 "A Better View" - 2:46

Personnel

Jimmy Monaghan – vocals, guitar
 Dónal Walsh - Drums

References

External links

Vitamins on Bandcamp

2014 albums
Music for Dead Birds albums